The following is an alphabetical list of members of the United States House of Representatives from the State of Rhode Island. For chronological tables of members of both houses of the United States Congress from the state (through the present day), see United States congressional delegations from Rhode Island. The list of names should be complete, but other data may be incomplete.

Current representatives 
 : David Cicilline (D) (since 2011)
 : Seth Magaziner (D) (since 2023)

List of members

See also

List of United States senators from Rhode Island
United States congressional delegations from Rhode Island
Rhode Island's congressional districts

Sources 
House of Representatives List of Members

Rhode Island

United States rep